Junooniyat is a 2016 Indian Hindi-language romantic drama film written and directed by Vivek Agnihotri. Produced by Bhushan Kumar under his T-Series banner, it stars Pulkit Samrat and Yami Gautam.

The film released worldwide on 24 June 2016 to a negative reception by critics.

Plot 
Captain Jahan Bakshi (Pulkit Samrat) is a passionate army officer who thinks all things happen according to his will and that he can control his destiny. Suhani (Yami Gautam), a Punjabi girl from an army family is found swimming in an army restricted area. She is later rescued by captain Jahan without her will. She has to stay in the army camp for a day because of the procedure. She asks Jahan to sign the apology letter. The investigating officer invites her to a Christmas party. After the party, they meet at a riverside. Jahan tears the letter, leading her to ask him to apologise or that she would leap. Jahan doesn't pay any heed to her, so Suhani leaps. However, he immediately saves her.
 
The next morning Jahan visit Suhani at the hospital and gives her the apology letter. They start developing feelings for each other. This further changes into love when Jahan meets Suhani at Amritsar and she plans a trip for Jahan by lying to her parents. When she returns, her father scolds her harshly, takes away her phone, and restricts her from going outside. This is due to him finding out Suhani's feelings towards Jahan. He fears that if Jahan were to die in the line of duty, Suhani would be heartbroken. Hence, he lays a condition for Jahan to either leave the army, or Suhani. Jahan refuses to comply and leaves. Having no other option left, Suhani elopes. However, after reaching the army camp, she sees a girl hugging Jahan, misunderstands the scenario, and returns home.

Later, Jahan and his team find people trapped under snow, saving them. Those people then invite him to the wedding of their son Yash. During the ceremony, he notices that the bride is Suhani. Rangoli clears Jahan's confusion and tells him to confess his love to Suhani. So he writes a letter to her which is instead read by Yash. Yash exclaims in front of everyone that he can't be so cruel to ruin Suhani and Jahan's love. Suhani's father too, accepts their love noticing Suhani's discontentment without Jahan. The story ends with Suhani and Jahan reuniting and kissing each other.

Cast 
 Pulkit Samrat as Captain Jahaan Bakshi
 Yami Gautam as Suhaani Kapoor
 Poonam Kaur as Kamya
 Hrishitaa Bhatt as Mishti
 Taran Bajaj as Tullu
 Gulshan Devaiah as Yash
 Aneesha Joshi as Rangoli
 Manoj Bakshi as Father

Production 
While returning from Kashmir, the crew was allegedly hounded and assaulted by Kashmiri locals, for using native girls in a song sequence.

Soundtrack

The music was composed by Meet Bros, Jeet Gannguli and Ankit Tiwari while the background score was by Raju Singh. Kumaar, Saurabh M Pandey, Rashmi Virag and Manoj Muntashir served as the lyricists.

On 28 June 2016, T-Series released a bonus track of the film on their YouTube channel, called, "Ishqe Di Khidki". On 12 July 2016, T-Series released another bonus track of the film on their YouTube channel, called, "Junooniyat (Unplugged)".

Box office
The film grossed  on its opening day in India and reached  in first week.

References

External links

T-Series (company) films
2016 films
2010s Hindi-language films
Films shot in Jammu and Kashmir
Indian romantic drama films
Films scored by Jeet Ganguly
Films scored by Meet Bros
Films scored by Ankit Tiwari
Films directed by Vivek Agnihotri
2016 romantic drama films